The Florida Brothers Building is a historic commercial building at 319 West Hale Street in Osceola, Arkansas. It is a single-story structure, built of cut stone, with a flat roof. Built in 1936 by Thomas P. Florida to house a real estate business, it is a good example of restrained Art Deco styling. Its main facade has a center entry flanked by plate glass windows, which are topped by stone lintels cut to give the appearance of dentil molding.  The entry has a projecting stone outline with reeding, and is topped by a decorative carving.

The building was listed on the National Register of Historic Places in 1987.

See also
Minaret Manor: nearby home of Andrew J. Florida
National Register of Historic Places listings in Mississippi County, Arkansas

References

Commercial buildings on the National Register of Historic Places in Arkansas
Art Deco architecture in Arkansas
Commercial buildings completed in 1936
Osceola, Arkansas
National Register of Historic Places in Mississippi County, Arkansas
Individually listed contributing properties to historic districts on the National Register in Arkansas
1936 establishments in Arkansas
Defunct real estate companies of the United States